"Incredible (What I Meant to Say)" is a song by Scottish singer-songwriter Darius, released as the third single from his debut album, Dive In (2002). It peaked at number nine on the UK Singles Chart, making it his third consecutive top-10 hit.

Music video
The video was shot over two days at the Estacion De Francia train station in Barcelona, Spain.

After Darius has an argument with his girlfriend, played by model Kate Groombridge, he tries to find her to apologise, but the train he thinks she is on leaves before he can say sorry. He then exits the train station down-hearted, just missing his girlfriend, who returns to find him.

Track listings
UK CD1
 "Incredible (What I Meant to Say)"
 "Rushes" (8 Jam remix)
 "Pretty Flamingo"
 "Incredible (What I Meant to Say)" (video)

UK CD2
 "Incredible (What I Meant to Say)"
 "Fragile"
 "Don't Forget to Breathe"

UK cassette single
 "Incredible (What I Meant to Say)"
 "Rushes" (8 Jam remix)

Credits and personnel
Credits and personnel are adapted from the Dive In album liner notes.
 Darius – writer, lead vocals, additional guitar, backing vocals
 The Matrix – writer, producer, arrangement, recording
 Jeremy Wheatley – mixing
 Corky James – guitars
 Ruben Martinez – backing vocals

Charts

Release history

References

2003 singles
Darius Campbell songs
Mercury Records singles
Song recordings produced by the Matrix (production team)
Songs written by Darius Campbell
Songs written by Lauren Christy
Songs written by Graham Edwards (musician)
Songs written by Scott Spock